The Society is an American mystery teen drama television series created by Christopher Keyser, that was released via streaming on Netflix on May 10, 2019. The series stars Kathryn Newton, Gideon Adlon, Sean Berdy, Natasha Liu Bordizzo, Jacques Colimon, Olivia DeJonge, Alex Fitzalan, Kristine Froseth, Jose Julian, Alexander MacNicoll, Toby Wallace and Rachel Keller. Although the series was initially renewed for a second season, it was ultimately canceled after one season as a result of the COVID-19 pandemic.

Premise
The Society follows the story of a group of teenagers who must learn to run their own community after the rest of the population of their town (West Ham, Connecticut) disappears. The mystery begins when the students of the local high school return early from a canceled field trip and find that everyone else is gone. A dense forest appears surrounding the town; the outside world apparently no longer exists and cannot be contacted by telephone or Internet. The teenagers must come up with their own rules to survive with limited resources.

Cast and characters

Main

 Kathryn Newton as Allie Pressman, Cassandra's younger sister who grew up in her shadow
 Gideon Adlon as Becca Gelb, Sam's best friend who is pregnant
 Sean Berdy as Sam Eliot, Allie and Cassandra's deaf cousin
 Natasha Liu Bordizzo as Helena, Luke's religious girlfriend
 Jacques Colimon as Will LeClair, Allie's best friend and love interest who grew up in foster care
 Olivia DeJonge as Elle Tomkins, an outcast who becomes Campbell's girlfriend
 Alex Fitzalan as Harry Bingham, the popular and wealthy son of the Town Mayor, and Kelly's boyfriend
 Kristine Froseth as Kelly Aldrich, Harry's girlfriend
 Jose Julian as Gordie, a smart kid who has a crush on Cassandra
 Alexander MacNicoll as Luke, Helena's boyfriend and former quarterback
 Toby Wallace as Campbell Eliot, Sam's older brother and Allie and Cassandra's cousin who exhibits psychopathic personality traits.
 Rachel Keller as Cassandra Pressman, Allie's older sister who is a natural leader. She has a congenital heart defect for which she is medicated.

Recurring
 Jack Mulhern as Grizz, a former football player
 Spencer House as Clark, a former football player and Gwen's on-and-off boyfriend
 Emilio Garcia-Sanchez as Jason, a former football player and Erika's boyfriend
 Salena Qureshi as Bean, a smart kid and Gordie's best friend
 Olivia Nikkanen as Gwen, Clark's on-and-off girlfriend
 Kiara Pichardo as Madison, Olivia and Gwen's friend
 Grace Victoria Cox as Lexie, Allie's rival
 Naomi Oliver as Olivia, Gwen and Madison's friend
 Kelly Rose Golden as Marnie
 Matisse Rose as Jessica
 Alicia Crowder as Erika, Jason's girlfriend
 Benjamin Breault as Blake
 Damon J. Gillespie as Mickey, Harry's housemate
 Peter Donahue as Shoe, a later member of The Guard
 Seth Meriwether as Greg Dewey
 Madeline Logan as Gretchen
 Dante Rodrigues as Zane

Guest
 Amy Carlson as Amanda Pressman
 David Aaron Baker as Jim Pressman
 Michael Siberry as Rodgers Eliot
 Paul Anthony Stewart as Doug Eliot
 Anastasia Barzee as Karen
 Chaske Spencer as Mr. Pfeiffer
 Chloe Levine as Emily
 Ava Gaudet as Lynette Eliot

Episodes

Production

Development
In 2013, Christopher Keyser and Marc Webb pitched the show to Showtime, but the network decided to pass on the series. On July 24, 2018, Netflix announced that it had given the production a series order. The series was created by Keyser, who also acted as writer and executive producer, with Webb directing.

Casting
Alongside the initial series announcement, it was confirmed that Kathryn Newton had been cast as a series regular. In November 2018, Rachel Keller, Gideon Adlon, Jacques Colimon, Olivia DeJonge, Alex Fitzalan, Kristine Froseth, Jose Julian, Natasha Liu Bordizzo, Alex MacNicoll, Jack Mulhern, Salena Qureshi, Grace Victoria Cox, Sean Berdy, and Toby Wallace joined the cast. Prior to the cancellation of the second season, it was planned that Olivia Nikkanen would be promoted to a series regular role for that season.

Filming
Principal photography took place in Lancaster, Massachusetts in September 2018.

Renewal and cancellation
The series was renewed for a second season in July 2019, but production was halted by the COVID-19 pandemic. It was announced on August 21, 2020 that the show had been canceled, the complications of the pandemic having led to cost increases and difficulty scheduling production.

Release

Marketing
On April 30, 2019, Netflix released the official trailer for the series.

Reception
The review aggregation website Rotten Tomatoes provides an 86% approval from 36 reviews, and an average rating of 7.44/10. The website's critical consensus states, "An intriguing tangle of mystery and melodrama, what The Society lacks in levity—and at times clarity—it makes up for with its surprisingly thoughtful exploration of community, culture, and what it means to grow up." On Metacritic, it has a weighted average score of 66 out of 100, based on 9 critics, indicating "generally favorable reviews".

References

External links
 
 

2010s American mystery television series
2010s American teen drama television series
2019 American television series debuts
2019 American television series endings
Dystopian television series
Gay-related television shows
Murder in television
English-language Netflix original programming
Serial drama television series
Television productions cancelled due to the COVID-19 pandemic
Television series about teenagers
Television shows filmed in Massachusetts
Television shows set in Connecticut
Thriller television series